Shenanigans are secret or dishonest activities that are typically complicated, humorous or interesting.

Shenanigans may refer to:

 Shenanigans (game show), a 1964–65 children's television game show
 Shenanigans (EP), a 1995 EP by the American punk rock band Squirtgun
 Shenanigans (album), a 2002 compilation album by Green Day
 Shenanigans (horse), an American thoroughbred mare

See also
 Practical joke, a mischievous trick played on someone, generally causing the victim to experience embarrassment, perplexity, confusion, or discomfort
 Shenanigan Kids, a 1920 animated series by Bray Productions
 Shamrocks & Shenanigans, 2004 album by the hip hop trio House of Pain and a song on the album